Manchester is an unincorporated community in Manchester Township, Dearborn County, Indiana.

History
A post office was established at Manchester in 1822, and remained in operation until it was discontinued in 1914. The community was named from Manchester Township.

Geography

References

External links

Unincorporated communities in Dearborn County, Indiana
Unincorporated communities in Indiana
1822 establishments in Indiana
Populated places established in 1822